Luis Raymund "L-Ray" Favis Villafuerte Jr. (born June 3, 1968) is a Filipino politician serving as the Representative of Camarines Sur's 2nd district since 2016. He was a House Deputy Speaker from 2019 until October 14, 2020. He previously served as the governor of Camarines Sur from 2004 to 2013.

He belongs to a family of politicians. His father is a former governor Luis Villafuerte Sr. His son is the former governor of Camarines Sur, Miguel Luis Villafuerte, and the incumbent governor Luigi Villafuerte.

Business career

He and his wife Lara own Lara's Gift and Décor, Inc., an export company serving clients in different countries. They were the only Philippine business directly selling to Target branches in the United States.

He was the President of Lara's Gift and Décor, Inc from 1990 to 2004, and President of Lara's Gift and Décor, Inc. U.S.A. from 2000 to 2004. He was also the President of Bicol Broadcasting Systems, Inc. (2001–2004), Global Merchandising Services Ltd. (2001–2004), Digitext Asia Corporation (2002–2004), and the Philippine Association of Medical Transcription, Inc. (2001–2004).

Currently, he is the CEO of Republic Wakeparks Inc., President of Blank Boardsports Supply Company Inc., Vice-President of Breddas Inc., and a Trustee of the Philippine Center for Entrepreneurship and the likes.

He is also President of Villafuerte Brotherhood Foundation, Inc, (2001–present) and of Philippine Water Ski and Wakeboard Federation, Inc. (2006-president) and serves as Vice-President of Asian Wakeboarding Association (2001–present) and an Executive board member of the Boy Scouts of the Philippines Camarines Sur Council (2003–present).

Political career

House of Representatives

During the 2020 House leadership crisis, Villafuerte supported House Speaker Alan Peter Cayetano's refusal to step down after Lord Allan Velasco was elected as the new speaker, Villafuerte was ousted from being a deputy speaker on October 14 and was replaced by Mikee Romero, a Velasco ally who was removed as a deputy speaker two weeks prior by Cayetano's side. 

In a statement, Villafuerte announced that he will continue to support President Rodrigo Duterte's legislative agenda, and added "if the intention of removing me was to intimidate all those who remain loyal to former Speaker Cayetano, then they have miscalculated badly." He also accused the new leadership of "rejecting" the Cayetano faction's "offers of cooperation."

References

Metro Society (December 2010 Issue)
The Bull Runner (July–August 2011 Issue)
http://www.philstar.com/feature/347159/gov-l-ray-villafuerte-cam-sur-ceo
Luis Raymund Villafuerte Jr. Curriculum Vitae

|-

1968 births
Living people
Members of the House of Representatives of the Philippines from Camarines Sur
Governors of Camarines Sur
Nationalist People's Coalition politicians
Nacionalista Party politicians
Bicolano people
Tagalog people
Bicolano politicians
People from Camarines Sur
De La Salle University alumni
Stanford Graduate School of Business alumni
Deputy Speakers of the House of Representatives of the Philippines